The following is a Mackerras pendulum for the 1999 Victorian state election.

"Safe" seats require a swing of over 10 per cent to change, "fairly safe" seats require a swing of between 6 and 10 per cent, while "marginal" seats require a swing of less than 6 per cent.

Notes
Seats which changed hands are shown in bold.

A plus (+) sign in front of a swing figure indicates a swing towards Labor and a minus (-) sign indicates a swing to the Liberal-National parties.

1 No  swing figure is available for this seat due to the lack of a Labor versus Liberal-National margin at the previous election.

2 The margin for this seat is Independent (Craig Ingram) over National.

3 The margin for this seat is Independent (Russell Savage) over Liberal.

4 The margin for this seat is Independent (Susan Davies) over Liberal.

5 The margin for this seat is National  over Independent (Chris Hazelman).

6 The margin for this seat is National  over Independent (Carl Ditterich).

References

 

Pendulums for Victorian state elections